Aethes furvescens is a species of moth of the family Tortricidae. It is found in Shanxi, China.

References

furvescens
Moths described in 1996
Moths of Asia